Saignes may refer to the following places in France:

 Saignes, Cantal, a commune in the Cantal department
 Saignes, Lot, a commune in the Lot department